The 2016 European Juniors Wrestling Championships was held in Bucharest, Romania between June 21–26, 2016.

Medal table

Team ranking

Medal summary

Men's freestyle

Men's Greco-Roman

Women's freestyle

References 

Wrestling
European Wrestling Juniors Championships
Sports competitions in Bucharest
European Juniors Wrestling Championships